Roy Knikelbine Henshaw (July 29, 1911 – June 8, 1993), was a professional baseball player who played pitcher in the Major Leagues from 1933 to 1944.

Born in Chicago, Henshaw played collegiately for the University of Chicago. Henshaw spent eight seasons in the Major Leagues as a member of the Brooklyn Dodgers, Chicago Cubs, St. Louis Cardinals, and Detroit Tigers. He played in the National Baseball Congress with the St. Joseph's Autos team in 1946.

Henshaw died on June 8, 1993, in LaGrange, Illinois.

References

External links

1911 births
1993 deaths
American expatriate baseball players in Mexico
Azules de Veracruz players
Baseball players from Chicago
Brooklyn Dodgers players
Chicago Cubs players
Detroit Tigers players
Jersey City Giants players
Los Angeles Angels (minor league) players
Major League Baseball pitchers
Mexican League baseball pitchers
Rochester Red Wings players
St. Louis Cardinals players